Salvador Elizondo Alcalde (Mexico City, December 19, 1932 - March 29, 2006) was a Mexican writer of the 60s Generation of Mexican literature.

Regarded as one of the creators of the most influential cult noirè, experimental, intelligent style literature in Latin America, he wrote as a novelist, poet, critic, playwright, and journalist.  His most famous novels are Farabeuf (1965) and  El hipogeo Secreto (1968).  He is also known for El grafógrafo (1972) which is a series of short texts based on linguistic abbreviatory experimentation. Farabeuf (tr. John Incledon) was published in English by Ox & Pigeon in 2015.

His style is considered innovative among Mexican contemporary literature for introducing a cosmopolitan view of language and narrative, bringing elements from external literary currents and languages to a refined dialogue of thought and communication. His technique is considered rather unrealistic and proto-fictional, as opposed to magical realism. Some critics have highlighted his literary works as postmodern literature since it challenges fiction through autofiction, metafiction, metalepsis, and by intertwining possible fictional worlds. His works are associated with writers such as Ezra Pound, James Joyce, Julio Cortázar, Juan Rulfo and Georges Bataille. He was also a professor at UNAM for 25 years (mentor of writers such as Pablo Soler Frost) and received many international grants, such as the Guggenheim and Rockefeller, and was the recipient of the 1990 national prize of literature. Elizondo died in Mexico City on March 29, 2006, of cancer. His funeral was held at the palacio de Bellas Artes.

Works
Poemas, 1960
Luchino Visconti (críticism), 1963
Farabeuf o la crónica de un instante (novela), 1965
Narda o el verano, 1966
Autobiografía, 1966
El hipogeo secreto (novela) 1968
Cuaderno de escritura (críticism), 1969
El retrato de Zoe, 1969
El grafógrafo, 1972
Contextos (critical articles), 1973
Museo poético (anthology of modern Mexican poetry), 1974
Antología personal, 1974
Miscast (A comedy in three Acts), 1981
Camera lucida, México, 1983
La luz que regresa, 1984
Elsinore: un cuaderno, 1988
Estanquillo (textos), 1992
Teoría del infierno, 1993
Pasado Anterior 2007

Selected filmography
 The Hypnotist (1940)
 Tender Pumpkins (1949)
 Philip of Jesus (1949)
 Seven Women (1953)
 The Three Elenas (1954)
 Back to the Door (1959)
 My Mother Is Guilty (1960)

Awards 
 Xavier Villaurrutia Prize (1965)

References

External links 
 Articles and stories by Salvador Elizondo in Letras Libres magazine (Spanish)
 Site and Trailer of the Documental "El Extraño Experimento del Profesor Elizondo"  a film from Gerardo Villegas, about life and works Salvador Elizondo 
A comprehensive study on El hipogeo secreto regarding intertwined fictional possible worlds, metafiction, and autofiction is developed by Gerardo Cruz-Grunerth in Mundos (casi) imposibles. Narrativa postmoderna mexicana (2018, in Spanish).   

1932 births
2006 deaths
Members of El Colegio Nacional (Mexico)
Writers from Mexico City
Deaths from cancer in Mexico
Mexican translators
20th-century translators

Poets from Mexico City